The Martinson mine is a large mine located in Ontario. Martinson represents one of the largest phosphates reserve in Canada having estimated reserves of 112 million tonnes of ore grading 21.4% P2O5.

See also 
List of mines in Ontario

References 

Phosphate mines in Canada